"Trains and Boats and Planes" is a song written by composer Burt Bacharach and lyricist Hal David. Hit versions were recorded by Bacharach in 1965, by Billy J. Kramer and the Dakotas in the same year, and by Dionne Warwick in 1966.

Original 1965 recordings
Bacharach and David wrote the song at a time when they had achieved great popular success. Bacharach, in particular, was traveling widely to record and promote his songs. The pair intended the song to be recorded by Gene Pitney, who had had several hits with earlier Bacharach and David songs, including "Only Love Can Break a Heart" and "Twenty Four Hours from Tulsa".  However, Pitney declined to record it, telling Bacharach, "it's not one of your better ones".  Bacharach then recorded it in London, with an orchestra, chorus, and uncredited vocals by female session singers The Breakaways. His version was issued on the 1965 album Hit Maker!: Burt Bacharach Plays the Burt Bacharach Hits and as a single.  According to writer Serene Dominic, 

While a special show was being recorded by Bacharach at the Granada Television studios in Manchester, producer Johnnie Hamp heard the song and arranged for it to be offered to a group who also recorded there, the Four Just Men (who later recorded as Wimple Winch). They turned it down, and the song then came to the attention of Brian Epstein, who suggested that Billy J. Kramer record it.  Kramer's recording was released at about the same time as Bacharach's own version, and both recordings entered the UK Singles Chart in the same week in May 1965. Other, less commercially successful, versions were issued in the UK around the same time by Anita Harris and Alma Cogan, and recordings were made in French by Claude François and Renée Martel ("Quand un bateau passe"). Within the same year, a German language version, ("Frag doch nur dein Herz") was recorded by Die Five Tops.

Bacharach's version reached No. 4 on the UK chart in 1965, while Kramer's recording reached No. 12 in the UK, becoming his final chart hit.  When released in the US, Kramer's version reached No. 47 on the Billboard Hot 100, and No. 10 on Billboards Easy Listening chart.

Dionne Warwick version
Dionne Warwick recorded the song in 1966. Her version was arranged and conducted by Bacharach, and produced by Bacharach and David. It spent seven weeks on the Billboard Hot 100 chart, and reached No. 22 on August 6, 1966. Warwick's version also reached No. 37 on Billboards Easy Listening chart and No. 49 on Billboards Hot Rhythm & Blues Singles chart.

Other recordings
Other recordings include those by Chet Baker (1966), The Everly Brothers, the Box Tops, The Shadows (instrumental), Joanie Sommers, Dinah Shore (all in 1967),  Astrud Gilberto (1969), Fred Frith (1997), Fountains of Wayne (2003), Gwyneth Herbert and Will Rutter on their 2003 album First Songs, Dwight Yoakam (2003), and Laura Cantrell on her 2008 EP Trains and Boats and Planes.

References

Songs about boats
Songs about trains
1965 songs
Songs with music by Burt Bacharach
Songs with lyrics by Hal David